|}

The Noel Novices' Chase is a Grade 2 National Hunt steeplechase in Britain. It is run at Ascot over a distance of about 2 miles and 5 furlongs (2 miles 5 furlongs and 8 yards, or 4,231 metres), and during its running there are 17 fences to be jumped. The race is scheduled to take place each year in December.

The race was known as the Peter Cox Novices' Chase until 1989. Prior to 2015 it was run over 2 miles and 3 furlongs.

Winners since 1987

See also
 Horse racing in Great Britain
 List of British National Hunt races

References
 Racing Post:
 

National Hunt races in Great Britain
Ascot Racecourse
National Hunt chases